Mayes Branch is a stream in Audrain County in the U.S. state of Missouri.

Mayes Branch has the name of Benjamin Mays, the original owner of the site.

See also
List of rivers of Missouri

References

Rivers of Audrain County, Missouri
Rivers of Missouri